WSSL may refer to:

 WSSL-FM, a radio station (100.5 FM) licensed to Gray Court, South Carolina, United States
 the ICAO code for Seletar Airport